John Peter Didier (1748–1823) was a U.S. politician and the first State Treasurer of Missouri.

John Peter Didier was reportedly a native of France. Prior to emigrated to the United States, he married Marie Elizabeth Mercier in Besancon, France on November 15, 1773. A prominent government official in the Missouri Territory, he served as Fire Captain in St. Louis, Missouri from 1811 to 1817. In 1817, he became Territorial Treasurer, serving in that post until 1818. In 1820, he was appointed as the first State Treasurer following the signing of the state constitution, but before Missouri was officially admitted as a state in August, 1821. Along with the other provisional state officeholders, he resigned when Missouri officially became a state in August 1821. Public records indicate that he died two years later on August 25, 1823.

References
 Missouri State Treasurer-Past Treasurer Biography 

1748 births
1823 deaths
State treasurers of Missouri
Politicians from St. Louis
People from Besançon
French emigrants to the United States